Yampi (also Romanized as Yāmpī; also known as Yāmchī) is a village in Gorganbuy Rural District, in the Central District of Aqqala County, Golestan Province, Iran. At the 2006 census, its population was 2,291, in 519 families.

References 

Populated places in Aqqala County